Sabine Sun (born 15 April 1940) is a French actress. She appeared in more than forty films since 1964 including several by director Terence Young.

Filmography
1961: The Bluffer of Sergio Gobbi
1962: Clementine Darling  Pierre Chevalier
1963: The King of the Village of Henri Gruel
1963: The Midnight Confession / The Adventures of Salavin of Pierre Granier-Deferre
1963: Chills all of Raoul André
1963: Hell is Empty of John Ainsworth and Bernard Knowles
1963: Strippers or Women Believed too Easy   Jean-Claude Roy
1964: Secret Agent FX 18 from Maurice Cloche
1964: Click and slaps  Philippe Clair
1964: Gorillas Jean Girault
1964: A Girl and Guns  Claude Lelouch
1965: Mechanical Piano  Juan Antonio Bardem
1965: Good weekend / The naggers of Roland J Quignon
1965: As long as one has the health of Pierre Etaix
1965: The Client's Head  Jacques Poitrenaud
1966: What's New Pussycat?   Clive Donner
1966: Commissioner X: Stop LSD Frank Kramer (Gianfranco Parolini)
1966: The Night of the Generals Anatole Litvak
1966 : Roger Shame Trap for the Assassin  Riccardo Freda
1966: The King of Hearts Philippe de Broca
1966: Hard Contract
1967: Kommissar X – Drei grüne Hunde
1967: Coplan opens fire in Mexico City - (Entre las redes / Moorish: Obiettivo allucinante) of Riccardo Freda
1967: Death Trip
1967: The 3 Fantastic Supermen  Gianfranco Parolini alias Frank Kramer
1967: The lab Crazy 4 Jacques Besnard
1967: Three girls at the sun
1968: Sartana Gianfranco Parolini
1968: The gentlemen of the family Raoul André
1969: The Sicilian Clan Henri Verneuil
1969: Désirella Jean-Claude Dague
1969: Mr. Freedom William Klein
1969: The Scarlet Lady
1969: Hallucinations sadistic Jean-Pierre Bastid
1969: The Libertines Dave Young (Pierre Chenal)
1969: Tropic of Cancer of Joseph Strick
1970: Cold Sweat
1970: Les Saintes beloved of Jean Becker , episode, Eve and her first client
1970: Love, yes! but ... - (Love life in Luxembourg) of Philippe Schneider and Franck Apprederis
1970: On behalf of friends of Terence Young
1970: Las piernas de la serpiente of Juan Marchal Xiol
1972: Cosa Nostra - The Valachi Papers Terence Young
1974: The Amazons/War Goddess  Terence Young
1981: Inchon  Terence Young
1983: The Jigsaw Man  Terence Young
1988: Marathon Run for Your Life of Terence Young

References

External links 
 

1940 births
Living people
French film actresses